League table for teams participating in Ykkönen, the second tier of the Finnish Soccer League system, in 1985.

League table

Replay for 2nd place: Reipas Lahti - LauTP Lappeenranta  5-0

Promotion/relegation playoff

Reipas Lahti - Koparit Kuopio  0-1
Koparit Kuopio - Reipas Lahti  2-2

Koparit Kuopio (formerly KPT Kuopio) stayed in Premier Division

See also
 Mestaruussarja (Tier 1)

References

Ykkönen seasons
2
Fin
Fin